Northumberland County is a county in the Commonwealth of Pennsylvania. It is part of Northeastern Pennsylvania. As of the 2020 census, the population was 91,647. Its county seat is Sunbury.

The county was formed in 1772 from parts of Lancaster, Berks, Bedford, Cumberland, and Northampton Counties and named for the county of Northumberland in northern England. Northumberland County is a fifth class county according to the Pennsylvania's County Code. Northumberland County comprises the Sunbury, Pennsylvania Micropolitan Statistical Area, which is also included in the Bloomsburg-Berwick-Sunbury, PA Combined Statistical Area. Among its notable residents, are Thomas L. Hamer a prior democratic congressman and Joseph Priestley, the Enlightenment chemist and theologian, left England in 1796 due to religious persecution and settled on the Susquehanna River. His former house, originally purchased by chemists from Pennsylvania State University after a colloquium that founded the American Chemical Society, is a historical museum.

History
Before European settlement the area was inhabited by the Akhrakouaeronon or Atrakouaehronon, a subtribe of the Susquehannock. By 1813 the area once comprising the sprawling county of Northumberland had been divided over time and allotted to other counties such that lands once occupied by Old Northumberland at its greatest extent are now found in Centre,  Columbia, Luzerne, Lycoming, Mifflin, Union, Clearfield, Clinton, Montour, Bradford, Lackawanna, Susquehanna, Wyoming, Tioga, Potter, McKean, Warren, Venango, Snyder, and  Schuylkill Counties.

Geography

The county has a humid continental climate (Dfa/Dfb). Average temperatures in Sunbury range from 27.3 °F in January to 72.7 °F in July, while in Mount Carmel they range from 25.0 °F in January to 70.2 °F in July. 

The Susquehanna River's tributaries in the county include the West Branch Susquehanna River, Chillisquaque Creek, Shamokin Creek, and the west flowing Mahanoy Creek, whose valley is a rail and road transportation corridor to Tamaqua and points thereafter either east, north, or south such that: east along rail or US 209 through Nesquehoning and historic Jim Thorpe; else northeast via Beaver Meadows leading north into Hazleton and the lower Wyoming Valley, or into the central Wyoming Valley skirting along the western Poconos via White Haven and Mountain Top; or otherwise head south through the Schuylkill Gap into Port Carbon and thence west to the Lancaster County or east via the greater Reading area into the lower Schuylkill Valley and Philadelphia. The county has mountains in the south and north, with the rest being mostly rolling hills.

Mountains

Major highways

Adjacent counties
Lycoming County (north)
Montour County (northeast)
Columbia County (east)
Schuylkill County (southeast)
Dauphin County (south)
Perry County (southwest)
Juniata County (west)
Snyder County (west)
Union County (west)

Demographics

As of the census of 2000, there were 94,556 people, 38,835 households, and 25,592 families residing in the county.  The population density was 206 people per square mile (79/km2).  There were 43,164 housing units at an average density of 94 per square mile (36/km2).  The racial makeup of the county was 97.09% White, 1.52% Black or African American, 0.10% Native American, 0.22% Asian, 0.02% Pacific Islander, 0.47% from other races, and 0.58% from two or more races.  1.10% of the population were Hispanic or Latino of any race. 32.5% were of German, 12.9% Polish, 9.9% American, 8.2% Italian, 8.1% Irish and 5.8% Dutch ancestry. 95.8% spoke English and 1.5% Spanish as their first language.

There were 38,835 households, out of which 27.30% had children under the age of 18 living with them, 52.40% were married couples living together, 9.60% had a female householder with no husband present, and 34.10% were non-families. 30.20% of all households were made up of individuals, and 15.50% had someone living alone who was 65 years of age or older. The average household size was 2.34 and the average family size was 2.89.

In the county, the population was spread out, with 21.90% under the age of 18, 7.00% from 18 to 24, 27.70% from 25 to 44, 24.40% from 45 to 64, and 19.00% who were 65 years of age or older.  The median age was 41 years. For every 100 females there were 96.30 males.  For every 100 females age 18 and over, there were 92.80 males.

2020 Census

Micropolitan Statistical Area

The United States Office of Management and Budget has designated Northumberland County as the Sunbury, PA Micropolitan Statistical Area (µSA). As of the 2010 census the micropolitan area ranked 2nd most populous in the State of Pennsylvania and the 37th most populous in the United States with a population of 94,528.  Northumberland County is also a part of the Bloomsburg–Berwick–Sunbury, PA Combined Statistical Area (CSA), which combines the population of Northumberland County as well as the Columbia, Montour, Snyder and Union County areas. The Combined Statistical Area ranked 8th in the State of Pennsylvania and 115th most populous in the United States with a population of 264,739.

Politics and government

|}

As of November 7, 2022, there are 58,632 registered voters in Northumberland County.

 Republican: 31,682 (54.04%)
 Democratic: 18,515 (31.58%)
 Independent: 5,547 (9.46%)
 Third Party: 2,888 (4.93%)

While county-level politics tend to be competitive, Northumberland is a Republican county in most statewide elections. The margins of victory in the county for the Republican presidential candidate in 2000, 2004, and 2008 have been 13, 21, and 14 percentage points, respectively. Governor Ed Rendell narrowly carried it against Lynn Swann while Republican Rick Santorum narrowly carried it against Bob Casey in 2006. The only Democratic statewide candidate to carry the county in 2008 was incumbent Auditor General Jack Wagner. In 2011, the election of Stephen Bridy resulted in a three-way split among the county commissioners.

County commissioners
Kymberley Best, Democrat
Joseph Klebon, Republican
Samuel Schiccatano, Republican

Other county offices
Clerk of Courts and Prothonotary, Jamie Saleski, Republican
Controller,  Christopher L. Grayson, Democrat
District Attorney, Anthony Matulewicz III, Republican
Recorder of Deeds and Register of Wills, Christina Mertz, Republican
Sheriff, Robert J.Wolfe, Republican
Treasurer, Kevin P. Gilroy, Republican
Coroner, James F. Kelley, Democrat

State House of Representatives
Kurt Masser, Republican, 107th district
Lynda Schlegel-Culver, Republican, 108th district

State Senator
John Gordner, Republican, 27th district

United States Representative
Dan Meuser, Republican, 9th district
Fred Keller, Republican, 12th district

United States Senate
 Pat Toomey, Republican
 Bob Casey Jr., Democrat

Education

Public school districts
 Danville Area School District (also in Montour County)
 Line Mountain School District
 Milton Area School District (also in Union County)
 Mount Carmel Area School District (also in Columbia County)
 Shamokin Area School District
 Shikellamy School District
 Southern Columbia Area School District (also in Columbia County)
 Warrior Run School District (also in Montour and Union Counties)

Career Tech school
Northumberland County Career Technology Center located in Coal Township

Intermediate Unit
Central Susquehanna Intermediate Unit 16 – The primary service area consists of: Columbia, Montour, Northumberland, Snyder and Union counties in central Pennsylvania. Provides a wide variety of education related services to school districts, private and parochial schools and hame schooled students.

Independent schools
Bethesda Alternative School, Milton 7–12th grade
Keefertown Parochial School 1–8th grade
Maranatha Mennonite Christian School K-12th grade
Meadowbrook Christian Academy PreK-12th grade
Meadowview Christian Academy PreK-10th grade
Northumberland Christian School PreK-12th grade
Northwestern Academy 5–12th grade
Our Lady of Lourdes Regional School preK–12th grade
Schwaben Creek School 1–8th grade
Spring View Parochial School, Watsontown 1–9th grade
St Louis De Monfort Academy, Herdon 7–12 grade
Sunbury Christian Academy, Northumberland K-12th grade
Sunny Slope Amish Parochial School 1–8th grade
Telos Educational Services Tutoring Center, Montandon
Transfiguration Elementary School, Shamokin PreK-8th grade
Watsontown Christian Academy, Watsontown  PreK-12th grade

Communities

Under Pennsylvania law, there are four types of incorporated municipalities: cities, boroughs, townships, and, in one case, a town. The following cities, boroughs, and townships are located in Northumberland County:

Cities
Shamokin
Sunbury (county seat)

Boroughs

Herndon
Kulpmont
Marion Heights
McEwensville
Milton
Mount Carmel
Northumberland
Riverside
Snydertown
Turbotville
Watsontown

Townships

Coal
Delaware
East Cameron
East Chillisquaque
Jackson
Jordan
Lewis
Little Mahanoy
Lower Augusta
Lower Mahanoy
Mount Carmel
Point
Ralpho
Rockefeller
Rush
Shamokin
Turbot
Upper Augusta
Upper Mahanoy
Washington
West Cameron
West Chillisquaque
Zerbe

Census-designated places
Census-designated places are geographical areas designated by the U.S. Census Bureau for the purposes of compiling demographic data. They are not actual jurisdictions under Pennsylvania law. Other unincorporated communities, such as villages, may be listed here as well.

Unincorporated communities

 Alaska
 Asherton
 Augustaville
Atlas
 Bear Gap
Bear Valley
 Big Mountain
 Boyd
 Boydtown
 Burnside
 Cabel
 Caketown
 Cameron
 Chillisquaque
 Chulasky
Coal Run
 Colonial Park
 Connersville
Dalmatia
 Deibler
 Delaware Run
 Diamondtown
 Dooleyville
Dewart
Dornsife
 Dunkelbergers
 East Lewisburg
Edgewood
Elysburg
 Excelsior
Fairview-Ferndale
 Farnsworth
 Fisherdale
Fishers Ferry
 Five Points
Gowen City
 Greenback
 Greenbriar
 Hamilton
 Hebe
 Helfenstein
 Hickory Corners
 Hunter
 Kapp
Kapp Heights
 Keefers
 Keiser
 Kipps Run
 Kline Grove
 Kneass
 Knoebels Grove
 Kulps
 Lantz
Leck Kill
 Line Mountain
 Lithia Springs
Locust Gap
 Locust Summit
Malta
Mandata
 Mayfair
 Meadowview
Marshallton
Merrian
 Mile Run
 Millers Crossroads
 Mount Carmel Junction
 Mount Pleasant
Montandon
Natalie
 North Hills
 Oak Park
 Oaklyn
 Otto
 Overlook
 Patricksburg
Paxinos
 Point Breeze
Potts Grove
 Purdytown
 Quitman
Rebuck 
Ranshaw
 Red Cross
 Reed
 Resler
 Rushtown
 Sagon
 Selinsgrove Junction
 Seven Points
 Shady Acres
 Shamrock
 Snufftown
 South Danville
 Springtown
 Stonington
Strong
 Sunnyside
Tharptown (Uniontown)
Trevorton
 Union Corner
Urban
 Warrior Run
 West Cameron
 Wolfs Crossroads
 Wolverton
 Yordy

Population ranking
The population ranking of the following table is based on the 2010 census of Northumberland County.

† county seat

See also
 National Register of Historic Places listings in Northumberland County, Pennsylvania

References

External links

 Official county website

 
1772 establishments in Pennsylvania
Anthracite Coal Region of Pennsylvania
Counties of Appalachia
Populated places established in 1772